Samuel Belton Horne (March 3, 1843 – September 18, 1928) was an American soldier who fought in the American Civil War. Horne received his country's highest award for bravery during combat, the Medal of Honor. Horne's medal was won for heroism at Fort Harrison, Virginia, on  September 29, 1864. He was honored with the award on November 19, 1897.

Horne was born in Belleek in County Fermanagh, Ireland, and entered service in Winsted, Connecticut, where he was later buried.

Medal of Honor citation

See also

List of American Civil War Medal of Honor recipients: G–L

References

1843 births
1928 deaths
American Civil War recipients of the Medal of Honor
Burials in Connecticut
Irish-born Medal of Honor recipients
Irish emigrants to the United States (before 1923)
People of Connecticut in the American Civil War
People from Belleek, County Fermanagh
People from Winsted, Connecticut
Union Army officers
United States Army Medal of Honor recipients
Military personnel from County Fermanagh